Volynsky may refer to:

Artemy Volynsky (1689–1740), Russian statesman and diplomat
Volodymyr-Volynskyi, Ukrainian city

See also
Novohrad-Volynskyi, a city in Zhytomyr Oblast, northern Ukraine
Novohrad-Volynskyi Raion, an administrative district in Zhytomyr Oblast